John Devane is a former hurler.  He attended his local club Clonoulty–Rossmore and participated for only one year on the Tipperary senior inter-county team panel, occupying a role as a substitute.

Devane was a substitute for the 2009 Munster Hurling final win. He was also an unused substitute in the 2009 All-Ireland Senior Hurling Championship Final defeat to Kilkenny. 

In November 2019, he was named as the new manager of the Tipperary Under 20 hurling team, a position he held until 2021.

Honours

Team
Tipperary

Munster Senior Hurling Championship (1): 2009

References

External links
 Tipperary Player Profiles

Living people
Tipperary inter-county hurlers
Clonoulty-Rossmore hurlers
Year of birth missing (living people)